is a public transportation company which operates local and long-distance buses in Niigata prefecture, Japan.

Bus lines

Regular buses
, Echigo Kotsu and its subsidiary (Minami Echigo Kanko Bus) operate regular buses mainly in the cities of Nagaoka, Kashiwazaki, Ojiya, Mitsuke, Sanjō, Tōkamachi, Uonuma and Minamiuonuma.

Highway buses
 Niigata - Nagaoka
 Niigata - Kashiwazaki
 Niigata - Takada - Naoetsu

References

External links
  

Bus companies of Japan
Nagaoka, Niigata
Companies based in Niigata Prefecture
Transport in Niigata Prefecture